Bahman Jan-e Olya (also Romanized as Bahman Jān-e ‘Olyā; also known as Bahman Jān, Bahmanjān-e Bālā, Qal‘eh-ye Bahman Jān, and Qal‘eh-ye Bahman Jān-e ‘Olyā) is a village in Radkan Rural District, in the Central District of Chenaran County, Razavi Khorasan Province, Iran. At the 2006 census, its population was 423, in 109 families.

See also 

 List of cities, towns and villages in Razavi Khorasan Province

References 

Populated places in Chenaran County